Fresh Aire 8 is an album by Mannheim Steamroller, released in 2000. It is the final album in the Fresh Aire series and is based on the topic of infinity, with each track or suite representing a different "aspect of infinity." The tracks' topics include ancient Greek philosophy, Leonardo da Vinci, M. C. Escher's Waterfall, Mannheim Steamroller's mascot, and the Judgment of Anubis. A visual album was also released on DVD.

Track listing

Personnel
Credits adapted from liner notes.
Chip Davis – composer, producer, arranger, conductor
London Symphony Orchestra
Jackson Berkey – piano solo on "The Circle of Love"
Arnie Roth – violin solo on "The Circle of Love"
Moray Welsh – cello solo on "The Circle of Love"
Tom Hartig – saxophone on "The Steamroller"

References

2000 albums
8
American Gramaphone albums